Municipal Airport  is a public use airport in Texas County, Oklahoma, United States. The airport is owned by the City of Texhoma and is located two nautical miles (3.7 km) west of its central business district. It is also known as Texhoma Municipal Airport.

Facilities and aircraft 
It has two runways: 3/21 is 3,564 by 48 feet (1,086 x 15 m) with an asphalt surface; 17/35 is 2,340 by 75 feet (713 x 23 m) with a turf surface.

For the 12-month period ending June 11, 2009, the airport had 500 general aviation aircraft operations, an average of 42 per month. At that time there were 6 aircraft based at this airport: 4 single-engine and 1 multi-engine and 1 ultralight.

References

External links 
 Aerial photo as of 10 February 1995 from USGS The National Map
 

Airports in Oklahoma
Buildings and structures in Texas County, Oklahoma